Incognito is an English adjective meaning "in disguise", "having taken steps to conceal one's identity".

Incognito may also refer to:

Film and television
 Incognito (1937 film), a Danish film
 Incognito (1997 film), an American crime thriller
 Incognito (2009 film), a film starring Jocelyn Quivrin
 Incognito, a 1915 comedy film short starring Rae Berger
 Incognito (game show), a British quiz show
 "Incognito" (Beavis and Butt-head episode)
 Incognito, a Mexican TV show hosted by Facundo Gomez
 Incognito, a character in the Disney XD sitcom Mighty Med
 Incognito, a character in the anime Hellsing

Music
 Incognito (band), a British acid jazz group
 Incognito (Celine Dion album), 1987
 Incognito (Amanda Lear album), 1981
 Incognito (No Use for a Name album), 1991
 Incognito (Spyro Gyra album), 1982
 "Incognito" (song), by Celine Dion
 "Incognito", a song by the Judybats from Native Son

Other uses
 Incognito (operating system), a Linux distribution
 Incognito (comics), a comic-book published by Marvel
 Incognito: The Secret Lives of the Brain, a book by neuroscientist David Eagleman
 Incognito Entertainment, American video game company
 Incognito mode, a feature of the Google Chrome browser
 Incognito, a novel by Petru Dumitriu
 Incognito, a novel by Cinzia Giorgio
 Incognito, alias of professional wrestler Jose Jorge Arriaga Rodriguez (Sin Cara) (born 1977)

See also
 Terra incognita, a term in cartography 
 Richie Incognito (b. 1983), American football player
 Ian Cognito (1958–2019), English stand-up comedian